Michael Cyril Creighton is an American actor and writer best known for his portrayal of Howard Morris in Only Murders in the Building, Patrick in High Maintenance,  Joe Crowley in Spotlight and his Writers Guild of America Award-winning web series Jack in a Box.

Life and career 
Creighton was raised on Long Island, New York, by his mother and maternal grandparents. 

He works regularly in film, television and theatre alternating between comedic and dramatic roles. Sarah Larson of The New Yorker says "Creighton has a gift for expressing the tension between the desire to connect and the desire to protect oneself."

On the stage, Creighton's credits include the world premiere of Jordan Harrison's "The Amateurs" at Vineyard Theater and the New York Premiere of Sarah Ruhl's Stage Kiss at Playwrights Horizons. For his portrayal of Kevin in Stage Kiss, he was named a "Face to Watch" by The New York Times and nominated for an Outer Critics Circle Award for Outstanding Featured Actor in a Play. He has worked numerous times with the Brooklyn-based theater company The Debate Society, originating several roles.

As a writer, in addition to creating and starring in the Writers Guild Award-winning web series Jack in a Box (2009–2012), he wrote and guest starred in an episode of the popular web series High Maintenance created by Katja Blichfeld & Ben Sinclair. The episode is called "Helen".

He was a founding member of the New York Neo-Futurists and performed weekly in Too Much Light Makes the Baby Go Blind.

Filmography

Film

Television

Stage

Awards and nominations
 2016 Film Independent Spirit Awards Robert Altman Award Recipient for Spotlight Ensemble
 2014 Outer Critics Circle Award, Nominee, Outstanding Featured Actor in a Play (for Stage Kiss)
 2013 Writers Guild of America Award, Winner, Outstanding Achievement in Writing Original New Media (for Jack in a Box)
 2012 Writers Guild of America Award, Nominee, Outstanding Achievement in Writing Original New Media (for Jack in a Box)
 2010 New York Television Festival, Winner, Best Web Series Pilot (for Jack in a Box)
 2010 New York Innovative Theatre Awards, Nominee for Outstanding Actor in a Featured Role (for MilkMilkLemonade)

References

External links

Living people
American male film actors
American male television actors
American male stage actors
Male actors from New York (state)
People from Long Island
21st-century American male actors
Year of birth missing (living people)
American gay actors